Giedrius Žutautas (born 15 March 1974, in Gargždai) is a retired Lithuanian professional footballer. He made his professional debut in the A Lyga in 1992 for FK ROMAR Mažeikiai.

His younger brother Darius Žutautas is also a professional footballer.

Honours
 Lithuanian A Lyga champion: 1999.

References

Lithuanian footballers
Lithuanian expatriate footballers
Lithuania international footballers
Russian Premier League players
Expatriate footballers in Russia
Association football defenders
FBK Kaunas footballers
FC KAMAZ Naberezhnye Chelny players
FC Moscow players
PFC Spartak Nalchik players
FK Liepājas Metalurgs players
1974 births
Living people
People from Gargždai